Marien Defalvard  is a French novelist, born on 20 February 1992 in Paris. In 2007–2008, he wrote his first novel. In 2011, he received the French literary prize, Prix de Flore and the Prix du Premier Roman prize from France.

Biography

Origins and training
The son of an economist, Marien Defalvard was born on 20 February 1992 in the 14th arrondissement of Paris.

He spent his childhood in Orléans, and attended school at Saint-Charles College (2001-2005), then at Jean-Zay High School (2005-2008).

He graduated at the age of 16 in 2008, before starting his first term at Pothier5 and Louis-le-Grand high schools.

Literary career

Marien Defalvar began writing his first novel in 2007, after having produced some youth texts.

His first novel, ‘Du temps qu’on existait’ (The time when we existed) appeared in 2011; it is distinguished by the style of its author, which surprises with respect to his youth. The reception of the novel is more divided. While Jérôme Garcin discovers "a sumptuous and well-mannered prose", Jérôme Dupuis calls it "indigestible pavement".

In spite of these contrasting reactions, ‘Du temps qu’on existait’ caught the attention of the critics on the occasion of the literary re-entry 2011 alongside the French art of the war of Alexis Jenni: the novel received the prices of Flore and the first novel, and appears in the first selection of Renaudot and December.

After the publication of this first novel, Marien Defalvard abandoned writing, and only returned to it in 2014–15.

In 2016, he published a first collection of poems, Narthex.

Works

 Du temps qu’on existait: novel, Paris, Grasset, 2011 (reprinted 2012), 372 p..
 Narthex: poems, Paris, Exils, coll. "Literature", 2016, 235 p..

References 

Living people
Writers from Orléans
Lycée Louis-le-Grand alumni
21st-century French writers
21st-century French novelists
21st-century French poets
1992 births